Vasily Vladimirovich Bartold (1869–1930), who published in the West under his German baptism name, Wilhelm Barthold, was a Russian orientalist who specialized in the history of Islam and the Turkic peoples (Turkology).

Barthold was born in St. Petersburg to a  Russianized German family. His career spanned the last decades of the Russian Empire and the first years of the Soviet Union.

Barthold's lectures at the University of Saint Petersburg were annually interrupted by extended field trips to Muslim countries. In the two volumes of his dissertation (Turkestan down to the Mongol Invasion, 1898-1900), he pointed out the many benefits the Muslim world derived from Mongol rule after the initial conquests. Barthold was the first to publish obscure information from the early Arab historians on the Kievan Rus'. He also edited several scholarly journals of Muslim studies, and contributed extensively to the first edition of the Encyclopaedia of Islam. In 1913, he was elected to the Russian Academy of Sciences. In February 1917 he was appointed to the Commission for the Study of the Tribal Composition of the Population of the Borderlands of Russia.

After the Russian Revolution, Barthold was appointed director of the Peter the Great Museum of Anthropology and Ethnography, a post he held from 1918 to 1921. He wrote three authoritative monographs on the history of Islam, namely Islam (1918), Muslim Culture (1918)  and The Muslim World (1922). He also contributed to the development of Cyrillic writing for the Muslim countries of Soviet Central Asia.

Most of his writings were translated to English, Arabic, and Persian. Barthold's collected works were reprinted in 9 volumes between 1963 and 1977, and whilst Soviet editors added footnotes deploring his 'bourgeois' attitudes, his prestige was such that the text was left uncensored, despite not conforming to a Marxist interpretation of history. Some of his works have been reprinted more recently in Moscow.

Works (selection)

12 lectures about ancient Turkic people
His lecture contains information about the sources of Turkic history, Orkhon Orkhon and Yenisei inscriptions, information in Chinese records regarding the various Turkish and Mongol tribes, earliest contacts with Iranian and Arab invaders, the first Turkish conversions to Islam and the economic and social conditions of Turkic people in Central Asia. 
Inscriptions don't give us clear answer which people called Turkic. Khan called his people Turk and the same moment Oguz or Tokuz- Oguz, but in some source mentioned that Oguz as Khan's enemies. In addition V.Radlov said in his work that Turkic people belongs to Oguz in the VI-VIIIc. and the Inscriptions support this idea. Oguzy divided into several nationalities such as: Kirgiz, Teles, Tardush, Karluk, Uygurs. However, no evidence that those people called themselves Turkic. Among the all nationalities from Orkhon inscription only one name of people known in Chinese source. Kirgiz also mentioned in a story about Khunn.

Turkic religion and Islam
The religion of Islam was successfully promoted among the Turkic people in the 9th-10th century along the river Amu Darya. In his work Barthold mentioned "Turkic Sky", "Turkic Earth and Water" and "Tengri" meaning the nature as a god. From other sources there is the word "Umai", "the child protector", whom the khan compared with his mother.

Gengiz Khan
In his work also mentioned about Gengiz Khan, his dynasty, his time and his sons.

Works
  «Туркестан в эпоху монгольского нашествия» (St. Petersburg: 1900)
  Turkestan Down to the Mongol Invasion (London: Luzac & Co) 1928 (Trans. T. Minorsky & C.E. Bosworth) 
  «Улугбек и его время» Ulugh-Beg (Leyden: 1918)
  "Ulug Beg und seine Zeit". In Abhandlungen für die Kunde des Morgenlandes 21, No. 1, (Leipzig:Brockhaus) 1935,  (Trans. Walther Hinz)
  "Ulugh-Beg". In Four Studies on the History of Central Asia Vol. II (Leiden: E.J. Brill) 1958 (Trans. V. & T.Minorsky) 
 Mussulman Culture (Kolkata: University of Calcutta) translated from Russian by Hasan Shaheed Suhrawardy 1934. 
  «Тюрки. Двенадцать лекций по истории турецких народов Средней Азии» [The Turks : twelve lessons on the history of the Turkic peoples of Central Asia]
  Zwölf Vorlesungen über die Geschichte der Türken Mittelasiens (Darmstadt: Wissenschaftliche Buchgesellschaft, 1932/35 and 1962)
  "A Short History of Turkestan" (1956). In Four Studies on the History of Central Asia Vol. I (Leiden: E.J. Brill) 1956 (Trans. V. & T.Minorsky) 
  An Historical Geography of Iran (Princeton: Princeton University Press) 1984 (translated by Svat Soucek; edited by C.E. Bosworth)
  Собрание сочинений (Москва: Издательство Восточной литературы) 1963-77 9 Vols.—Complete works
  Отчет о поездке в Среднюю Азию с научною целью (С.Пб.: Тип. Имп. Академии Наук) 1897
  История культурной жизни Туркестана (Москва: Изд. Академии наук СССР) 1927
  Работы по исторической географии (Москва: Изд. фирма «Восточная литература» РАН) 2002

Notes

References 

1869 births
1930 deaths
Full Members of the Russian Academy of Sciences (1917–1925)
Full members of the Saint Petersburg Academy of Sciences
Full Members of the USSR Academy of Sciences
Islam and politics
Khazar studies
Writers from Saint Petersburg
Anthropologists from the Russian Empire
Russian people of German descent
Historians from the Russian Empire
Orientalists from the Russian Empire
Soviet historians
20th-century Russian historians
Turkologists